Sweden competed at the 2012 Summer Paralympics in London, United Kingdom, from 29 August to 9 September 2012.

Medalists

Archery

Men

|-
|align=left|Robert Larsson
|align=left|Ind. compound open
|636
|19
|W 7–3
|L 1–7
|colspan=4|Did not advance
|}

Women

|-
|align=left|Zandra Reppe
|align=left|Ind. compound open
|642
|7
|
|L 4–6
|colspan=4|Did not advance
|}

Athletics

Boccia

Cycling

Equestrian

Goalball

Men's tournament

Roster

Group stage

Women's tournament

Roster

Group stage

Quarter-final

Semi-final

Bronze medal match

Judo

Shooting

Swimming

Table tennis

Wheelchair rugby

Roster
The following is the Sweden roster in the wheelchair rugby tournament of the 2012 Summer Paralympics.

Group stage

5th–8th place semi-final

Classification 5-6

Wheelchair tennis

Notes
 Official site

See also
 Sweden at the 2012 Summer Olympics

Nations at the 2012 Summer Paralympics
2012
Paralympics